Amman Sports Club is a women's football club based in Amman, Jordan. The club is the women's section of Amman SC, and they play in the Jordan Women's Football League.

Amman won their first league title in the 2010–11 season, ending the dominance of Shabab Al-Ordon. They became the first Jordanian club to participate in the AFC Women's Club Championship in 2021, which they won after finishing top of their group.

Honours

Domestic
Jordan Women's Football League
 Champions (5): 2010–11, 2014–15, 2016–17, 2020, 2021

Continental
AFC Women's Club Championship
 Champions (1): 2021

References

External links
 Kooora profile
 

Sport in Amman
2005 establishments in Jordan
Association football clubs established in 2005
Women's football clubs in Jordan